Larry Snook (born June 19, 1941) is a retired United States Army Colonel who served as Grimes County Judge from January 1, 1991 to December 31, 1994 and Grimes County Commissioner, Precinct 1 from January 1, 2000 to December 31, 2003.

Early life
Larry Snook was born June 19, 1941 in Kilgore, Texas to Dave Maxie Snook and Mary Frances (Noble) Snook.  Dave and Mary Snook eventually moved to Iola, Texas where Larry was an All District football player for the Iola School Bulldogs.

Rodeo career
Larry Snook began his rodeo career in High School and continued through College and into the early part of his Army Career.  He was a Member of the Professional Rodeo Cowboys Association and participated in bull riding, saddle bronc and bareback riding events.

Military career
Larry Snook was commissioned a Second Lieutenant in the Regular Army from Sam Houston State Teachers College in 1963.  From 1963 to 1965 he served as a Recon Platoon Leader and Company Executive Officer in the 2nd Battalion, 8th Cavalry Regiment which later became the 1st Squadron, 10th Cavalry Regiment in the 4th Infantry Division at Fort Lewis, Washington.
He was selected for the initial entry rotary wing aviator course in 1966.  He attended flight school at Fort Wolters, Texas and Fort Rucker, Alabama.  Following flight school he continued his military education attending the Aviation Maintenance Officer Course at Fort Eustis, Virginia.
After the Aviation Maintenance Officer Course he shipped out to Vietnam and was assigned to the 15th Transportation Company, Aviation Maintenance and Supply serving as the Production Control officer and Shops Platoon Commander.  Snook, Captain at the time, conducted numerous down aircraft recovery missions outside of his main base of operations earning him the Bronze Star Medal and two Air Medals.
In early 1968 Snook returned from Vietnam and attended the UH-1 Instructor Pilot Course and was assigned as the deputy Huey branch chief, instructing UH-1 contact course at Fort Rucker, Alabama.  Snook flew over 700 instructor pilot hours teaching new pilots how to fly the UH-1 in combat.

1969 19th Assault Support Helicopter Company (CH-47), Platoon Leader, Executive Officer, Republic of Korea

1970 Eustis Transportation Corps CCC

1971 D Company, 227th Aviation (CH-47), Commander, Fort Hood (unit is now 4th Battalion, 227th Aviation Regiment

1972 1st Cavalry Division Transportation Officer

1973 1st Cavalry Division DISCOM Security, Plans, and Operations (SPO) officer, Fort Hood

1974 XO 34th Support Battalion, Fort Hood

1975 Recruiting Command, Deputy Commander, Richmond, VA

1976 Resident CGSC

1977 Training With Industry, Petroleum Helicopters Inc., Lafayette, LA

1978 213th Assault Support Helicopter Company (CH-47) Camp Humphries, Republic of Korea

1979 Transportation School Director of the Department of Aviation trades AIT

1981 193rd Infantry Brigade, Logistics Support Command (responsible for the full SOUTHCOM AO including embassies)

1984 Inspector General Aviation Support Command (AVSCOM)/Troop Support Command (TROSCOM), St. Louis, MO

1987 AVSCOM LNO to III Corps and Fort Hood AH-64 Battalion Fielding in conjunction with the Apache Training Brigade.  Personally managed damage assessment and repair of three major storm events

Medals, badges, unit awards and ribbons

Retirement
Larry Snook officially entered retirement after his time as the Democratic Party Chairman.  He enjoys raising his donkeys and horses on his ranch.

Political career
In March 1990, months after his official retirement from the United States Army, Larry Snook was essentially elected Grimes County Judge in his first election for any office at any level.  This was the Democratic primary election and as there was no Republican candidate, he ran unopposed in the November general election.

As Precinct 1 Commissioner, Larry Snook helped to bring about the Iola Courthouse Annex. This building provides offices for the Precinct 1 officials and a courtroom.

Notes

References

1941 births
County commissioners in Texas
Living people
Sam Houston State University alumni
United States Army Command and General Staff College alumni
Recipients of the Legion of Merit
Recipients of the Air Medal
County judges in Texas
Bull riders
Military personnel from Texas
Saddle bronc riders
Bareback bronc riders
People from Kilgore, Texas
People from Grimes County, Texas
American Master Army Aviators
United States Army colonels